Walter Routledge (28 April 1907 – 1 August 1963) was a South African cricket umpire. He stood in two Test matches between 1935 and 1936.

See also
 List of Test cricket umpires

References

1907 births
1963 deaths
Place of birth missing
South African Test cricket umpires